Assemble with Care is a 2019 puzzle video game developed by Ustwo Games. The game centers on an antique restorer who goes around a town fixing broken objects. The game originally released on Sep 19, 2019 for IOS and MacOS as a launch title for Apple Arcade. A Microsoft Windows version was later released on March 26. 2020.

Gameplay 
In the game you repair various devices in order to help the people of Bellariva, a fictional town in Spain. The repair sections are separated by interludes in which it sets up the protagonist's reasons for repairing the device.

Reception 

The game received positive reviews from critics who praised the puzzle based gameplay and the story. It has a Metacritic score of 72. CJ Andriessen, writing for Destructoid praised the touch controls and storybook presentation of the game. TouchArcade's Tyler Woodward enjoyed the stylized graphics and the game's story.

References 

2019 video games
IOS games
MacOS games
Puzzle video games
Single-player video games
Ustwo games
Video games developed in the United Kingdom
Video games set in Spain
Windows games